Blenheim High School is a secondary school located at Longmead Road, Epsom, Surrey, England, that opened in 1997. It is a coeducational, publicly funded academy that educates children from ages 11–18, with 1,350 pupils on roll.

Academic standards
In the [Ofsted] inspection carried out in May 2019, the school was rated as "Good", point two on the four-point scale (one being the highest).

In the Ofsted inspection carried out in January 2017, the school was rated as "Requires Improvement," point three on the four-point scale (one being the highest).

In the Ofsted inspection carried out in summer 2013 the school was rated as "Good," point two on the four-point scale (one being the highest).

In the Ofsted inspection carried out in February 2010 the school was rated as "Satisfactory," point three on the four-point scale (one being the highest).

In the previous, February 2007, Ofsted inspection the school was rated "Good," point two on the scale, and described as "a good school with many outstanding features." The school had been rated "Outstanding" in relation to the questions:
 How good is the overall personal development and well-being of the learners?
 How effective are leadership and management in raising achievement and supporting all learners?

Ofsted described Blenheim as 'calm, orderly and purposeful’.

Admission arrangements
The school was oversubscribed in 2020 and prior to 2011.

On 5 October 2001 the admission arrangements were reviewed by an independent adjudicator who decided:
 The school should not name priority wards because this would discriminate in favour of children from the Borough of Epsom and Ewell, to the disadvantage of those who live in the London Borough of Sutton.
 The priority given to children of governors or staff should be removed.

Parliamentary mentions
On 26 October 2001 Stephen Timms, then Minister of State for School Standards, in a written answer, gave an assurance to Chris Grayling MP that the funding of the school would be safeguarded despite the ending of grant-maintained status.

School organisation

Houses
The school has four houses, named after Famous Race horses from the Local Darby.

 Nashwan – Red
 Octavius – Green
 Sinndar – Blue
 Tulyar – Yellow

The ties (burgundy with diagonal white stripes) feature the school logo situated just under the knot, over a stripe of the colour denoting the house of the student.

Rebranding
As of September 2021 the school underwent a 're-branding', which included a new logo. The logo incorporates the four house colours of red, green, blue and yellow. The new school motto, 'work ethic, resilience, innovation, improvement', is below the logo.

Teaching and management staff
In November 2020 the school has:
13 Headteachers, deputy headteachers and assistant headteachers
47 Subject, etc., heads
37 other teaching staff

Awards
 In 2021 the school was named Surrey's Most Improved Secondary School for its large increase in number of applications and first choice preferences.
In 2019 the school was named Surrey's Most Improved Secondary School for its improved exam results.
Rolls-Royce Science Prize (Special Merit Award Winner 2007)

References

External links
 

Epsom
Secondary schools in Surrey
Educational institutions established in 1997
Academies in Surrey
1997 establishments in England